Kenneth George Goodall (23 February 1947 – 17 August 2006) was an Irish rugby union and rugby league player. He was an Irish international and British Lions player and vice principal at Faughan Valley High School, which is now part of Lisneal College. He switched codes in 1970 to play for the Cumbrian rugby league club, Workington Town.

He was educated at Foyle College and then read chemical engineering at Newcastle University.  He made his début on the rugby pitch in a match against Australia on 21 January 1967 and subsequently played for Ireland in 19 successive matches until 14 March 1970.

He was a member of City of Derry R.F.C., played for Newcastle University, club rugby for Winlaton Vulcans RFC in West Gateshead before playing for Workington. Between 1970 and 1974, Goodall played 82 matches for Town, scoring 25 tries.

He was reintroduced to rugby union and was reinstated by the Irish Rugby Football Union when the game became professional.

External links
Ken Goodall

1947 births
2006 deaths
Alumni of Newcastle University
British & Irish Lions rugby union players from Ireland
City of Derry R.F.C. players
Ireland international rugby union players
Ulster Rugby players
Irish rugby league players
Irish rugby union players
Irish schoolteachers
People educated at Foyle College
Rugby league players from County Londonderry
Rugby union players from County Londonderry
Sportspeople from Derry (city)
Workington Town players